Gordon John Garradd (born 1959) is an Australian amateur astronomer and photographer from Loomberah, New South Wales. He has discovered numerous asteroids and comets, including the hyperbolic comet C/2009 P1, and four novae in the Large Magellanic Cloud. The asteroid and Mars-crosser, 5066 Garradd, was named in his honour.

He has worked for a number of astronomical institutions in the US and Australia, most recently at Siding Spring Observatory on the Siding Spring Survey, part of the NASA-funded Catalina Sky Survey for near-Earth objects (2002–2011). , the Minor Planet Center credits him with the discovery of 31 minor planets (see table). There are 16 comets and an asteroid that bear his name. His cometary discoveries include 186P/Garradd (comet Garradd 1), a Jupiter-family comet, and 259P/Garradd (comet Garradd 4), an Encke-type comet.

Garradd was born in Australia and lived his early life in Sydney, Canberra, Oberon, and Tamworth. Astronomy has been an interest since his childhood, and he has built many telescopes himself, starting with a 20 cm (8") f/7 Newtonian while still in high school, graduating to making mirrors up to 46 cm (18″) diameter and mounts up to the fork mount for the 46 cm f/5.4 Newtonian, and German equatorial mounted 25 cm (10") f/4.1 that he used for observing near-Earth asteroids and comets.

His initial profession was as an accountant, but he left that in 1984 to pursue astronomy and photography full-time. He lives with his wife Hether, off the power grid, using solar and wind power. He is a photographer, mountain bike rider, and solar- and wind-power enthusiast.

References

External links 
 Garradd's web site

1959 births
20th-century Australian astronomers
Discoverers of asteroids

Living people